The Fruit of Grisaia is a 13-episode anime television series based on the visual novel of the same name by Front Wing. The anime is animated by Eight Bit, produced by NBCUniversal, and directed by Tensho. It aired in Japan between October 5 and December 28, 2014 on AT-X. The screenplay is written by Hideyuki Kurata, character designs and chief animation direction are handled by Akio Watanabe, and Elements Garden composed the music. The anime has been licensed for digital and home video release by Sentai Filmworks. Anime adaptations of The Fruit of Grisaia sequels Le Labyrinthe de la Grisaia and Le Eden de la Grisaia premiered in April 2015.

Several ending themes from the game included as insert songs are also used in the anime such as "Holograph" in episode six and "Lost Forest" in episode nine.

Episode list

The Fruit of Grisaia

The Labyrinth of Grisaia

The Eden of Grisaia

References

Fruit of Grisaia